Elio Germano (born 25 September 1980) is an Italian actor. He is the recipient of many accolades, including a Cannes Film Festival Award for Best Actor and a Silver Bear for Best Actor.

Life and career
Born in Rome to a Molisan family from Duronia, Province of Campobasso, Germano debuted aged twelve in Castellano e Pipolo's movie Ci hai rotto papà (1992). During his studies at scientific lyceum, he received acting training at Teatro Azione in Rome. In 1999, he abandoned an opportunity to work in theatre with Giancarlo Cobelli in order to play in Carlo Vanzina's film Il cielo in una stanza, which launched Germano as one of the most popular Italian actors. His big break came in 2007, when he was cast as the lead in the successful movies Fallen Heroes and  My Brother is an Only Child by Daniele Luchetti. The following year he first received international recognition by winning the Shooting Stars Award at the 58th Berlin International Film Festival.

Germano worked with numerous directors such as Ettore Scola (Concorrenza sleale), Emanuele Crialese (Respiro), Gianluca Maria Tavarelli (Liberi), Giovanni Veronesi (Che ne sarà di noi), Michele Placido (Romanzo criminale), Gabriele Salvatores (Quo Vadis, Baby?, Come Dio comanda), Paolo Virzì (Napoleon and Me, Tutta la vita davanti), Francesco Patierno (The Early Bird Catches the Worm), Daniele Vicari (Il passato è una terra straniera) and Ferzan Özpetek (Magnifica Presenza).

For his role in the movie My Brother is an Only Child (2007), he won his first David di Donatello as best actor in a leading role. In 2010, he won the Best Actor Award, ex-aequo with Javier Bardem, at the Cannes Film Festival, for his interpretation in La Nostra Vita. Later that year, he played the son of Italian journalist Tiziano Terzani in The End Is My Beginning. For his portrait of 19th century poet Giacomo Leopardi in Mario Martone's film Leopardi, Germano was praised at the 71st Venice International Film Festival.

Personal life
At an early age Germano liked creating comics and thought about becoming a cartoonist. When he was not accepted into the school of graphic arts, he then opted for acting. In his spare time, Germano makes rap for a music band called Bestierare, which sings about "unemployment, homelessness, precariousness, prisons and Fascist violence."

Filmography

Film

Television

Music videos

Theatre

Awards

References

External links

1980 births
Living people
People of Molisan descent
Male actors from Rome
Cannes Film Festival Award for Best Actor winners
Silver Bear for Best Actor winners
David di Donatello winners
Nastro d'Argento winners
Italian male film actors
Italian male television actors
Italian male stage actors
20th-century Italian male actors
21st-century Italian male actors